Haludaria kannikattiensis is a species of cyprinid fish endemic to India where it is only known from hill streams in the southern Western Ghats.

References 

Haludaria
Freshwater fish of India
Endemic fauna of the Western Ghats
Fish described in 2003